James Keziah Delaney is a fictional character from the 2017 BBC series Taboo, portrayed by Tom Hardy.

Background 
James returns to London in 1814, after 12 years in Africa, for the funeral of his father Horace Delaney, shrouded in mystery and preceded by wild rumours.

A London that lives in the Regency era, which despite being a liberal era, the lower classes are whipped by the rich, corruption is on the rise, reaching from the bourgeoisie to the Crown. But for Delaney, the part that interests him is the advance of imperialism against the natives of Nootka Island, which he will face with running his own company, the Delaney Nootka Company.

Appearance and personality 
James is a bourgeois Londoner, adventurer, enigmatic and mysterious, with a fanaticism for violence and rebellion. His character is cold, direct and inexorable. James follows his plans and ideas without ever doubting them. He indulges in special rituals, showing his belief and appreciation for the mysticism. He is implied to communicate and interact through 'black magic' with his half-sister Zilpha, as well as having a strong sense of the presence of his dead mother. During his training at the Company, James proved to be an outstanding cadet, an expert in all manner of weapons, fighting, and survival. James is a man in his early thirties with a proportionate figure, a scarred face, and blue eyes. James has several tribal tattoos all over his body, made during his stay in Africa.

References 

British drama television characters
Male characters in television
Television characters introduced in 2017